Tadzin may refer to the following places:
Tadzin, Kuyavian-Pomeranian Voivodeship (north-central Poland)
Tadzin, Brzeziny County in Łódź Voivodeship (central Poland)
Tadzin, Łódź East County in Łódź Voivodeship (central Poland)